Hydrogen narcosis (also known as the hydrogen effect) is the psychotropic state induced by breathing hydrogen at high pressures. Hydrogen narcosis produces symptoms such as hallucinations, disorientation, and confusion, which are similar to hallucinogenic drugs. However, hydrogen has far less narcotic effect than nitrogen (which causes the better known nitrogen narcosis) and is very rarely used in diving.

See also

References

Underwater diving safety
Breathing gases
Diving medicine